Los Angeles Athletic Club (LAAC) is a privately owned athletic club and social club in Los Angeles, California, United States. Established in 1880, the club is today best known for its John R. Wooden Award presented to the outstanding men's and women's college basketball player of each year.

History

Establishment

The Los Angeles Athletic Club (LAAC) was founded on September 8, 1880. By the end of its first month of existence the fledgling club counted 60 enlisted members and was able to rent its first facility, two halls located in Stearns Hall on Los Angeles Street in downtown Los Angeles. A 19th Century history indicates that the club had the dual purposes of "providing its members with the means of physical development" along with "the advantages of a gentlemen's club.

The club relocated for the first time in 1881, moving to more commodious accommodations in the Downey Block, before moving again a few years later to a still-larger home in the Stowell Block. A fire in 1893 required moving to temporary quarters in the Workman Block, next door to the previous Stowell Block location. Membership in this latter location soon topped the 400 mark, prompting the construction of the club's own permanent building, a four-story structure with a cavernous gymnasium located on an enlarged third floor. It was located on the east side of Spring Street between 5th and 6th, architects were McCarthy & Mendel.

The club provided a venue for gymnastics, athletic training, and team sports, including organization of a civic football team which played the inaugural intercity match with San Francisco in January 1892. During its first two decades of existence the club also established an outdoors athletic park, which included a running track and path for bicycling, a baseball diamond, tennis courts, and facilities for croquet. It also provided rooms designed for socialization, including an expansive reading room, as well as designated areas for billiards and cards.

1912 relocation

In 1912 it moved into its own new Los Angeles Athletic Club Building at 431 West Seventh Street in Downtown Los Angeles.  The twelve-story  Beaux-Arts style clubhouse was designed for the LAAC by John Parkinson and George Bergstrom, and is a Los Angeles Historic-Cultural Monument. The building was notable for being the first in Southern California to have an interior swimming pool built on an upper floor.

Due to its position in the growth and development of Los Angeles, the LAAC had significant success during its first 60 years, with membership reflecting its position in Los Angeles society and early Hollywood culture. During its heyday, the LAAC founded a number of other institutions, including the California Yacht Club (1922) and Riviera Country Club (1926). They are now separate entities.

The club faced significant financial burdens due to World War II and the subsequent growth of suburbs.

Athletes from the LAAC have earned numerous medals in the Summer Olympics, with a particularly high number during the 1932 Los Angeles Olympiad. The total Olympic medal tally for the LAAC is 97 medals, including 47 gold.

Notable members

Arthur Alber, Los Angeles City Council member, 1927–29
L. Frank Baum
Charlie Chaplin
 Lillian Copeland (1904–1964), Olympic discus champion; set world records in discus, javelin, and shot put
Reginaldo Francisco del Valle, California State Senator who was instrumental in forming UCLA. California Water Commissioner responsible for bringing water from the Sierras to the city. His wife Helen co-owned the Los Angeles Times. Del Valle was an Attorney. 
George P. Cronk, Los Angeles City Council member, 1945–52
Vesey Alfred Davoren was the founder and commodore of the Topanga Yacht Club, and was given the sobriquet of "Captain."
Edward L. Doheny
Mayor Fred Eaton
 Philip "Phil" Erenberg (1909–1992), gymnast and Olympic silver medalist
Caroline Estes Smith
Douglas Fairbanks Jr.
Robert Frederick Foster
Louis F. Gottschalk
A. E. Henning, Los Angeles City Council member, 1929–33
Henry Huntington
Duke Kahanamoku, member of LAAC swimming and water polo teams, also club's lifeguard
Georgia Thatcher Kemp (November 22, 1868 – March 9, 1945)
Harold Lloyd
Parry O'Brien, Olympic shot put champion
Colonel Harrison Otis
Mary Pickford
William Desmond Taylor, movie director
Moses Sherman
Rudolph Valentino
Johnny Weissmuller
Senator Stephen White
Esther Williams

See also

 List of American gentlemen's clubs
 List of Los Angeles Historic-Cultural Monuments in Downtown Los Angeles

Footnotes

Further reading

 Sandi Hemmerlein, "The Los Angeles Athletic Club: The Story of an LA Icon," Discover Los Angeles, Aug. 3, 2015.
 Charles F. Lummis (ed.), "Los Angeles Athletic Club," The Land of Sunshine [Los Angeles], vol. 5, no. 3 (Aug. 1896). pp. 134–138.
 Henry Winfred Splitter, "Los Angeles Recreation, 1846-1900: Part 1," Historical Society of Southern California Quarterly, vol. 43, no. 1 (March 1961), pp. 35–68. In JSTOR
 Henry Winfred Splitter, "Los Angeles Recreation, 1846-1900: Part 2," Historical Society of Southern California Quarterly, vol. 43, No. 2 (June 1961), pp. 166–199. In JSTOR

External links
Los Angeles Athletic Club website
List of actors who listed LAAC as their residence

Clubs and societies in California
Athletics clubs in the United States
Buildings and structures in Downtown Los Angeles
Multi-sport clubs in the United States
Athletics (track and field) venues in Los Angeles
Baseball venues in Los Angeles
Gymnastics venues in Los Angeles
Swimming venues in Los Angeles
Tennis venues in Los Angeles
Sports venues in Los Angeles
Gentlemen's clubs in California
Organizations based in Los Angeles
Sports clubs established in 1880
1880 establishments in California
Los Angeles Historic-Cultural Monuments
1910s architecture in the United States
John and Donald Parkinson buildings